Madan Malla was the forty-third king of the Mallabhum, ruling from 1407 to 1420 CE.

History
Madan Malla established of the idol of Madan Mohan and extension of Mallabhum up to Raipur.

References

Sources
 

Malla rulers
Kings of Mallabhum
15th-century Indian monarchs
Mallabhum